is a Shinto shrine in the Ichinomiya neighborhood of the city of Takamatsu in Kagawa Prefecture, Japan. It is the ichinomiya of former Sanuki Province. The main festivals of the shrine are held annually on May 8 and October 8. It is located approximately 7 km south of downtown Takamatsu. The area has abundant spring water, and the shrine is based on the worship of the god of water and the shrine's inner shrine is built over a spring. The name 'Tamura' is based on locale, and has no relationship with Sakanoue no Tamuramaro like other shrines of the same name in other parts of Japan.

Enshrined kami
The kami enshrined at Tamura Jinja are:
 ,  the daughter of the 7th Emperor Kōrei, and a miko known for her divine marriage with Omononushi (the god of Mount Miwa) 
 , the son of Emperor Kōrei and conqueror of the Kingdom of Kibi.
 ,  leader of the earthly kami.

History
The origins of Tamura Jinja are unknown. The monk Gyoki built a shrine over a sacred  well in 709 AD; however, it is also recorded that a Buddhist temple was built at this site in that Taihō era (701-704). The temple and shrine were patronized by the Imperial family from an early date. The shrine is mentioned in the "Nihon Sandai Jitsuroku" and Engishiki records from the early Heian period, and was regarded as the ichinomiya of the province from this time.  It was promoted to Shoichii (Senior First Rank) in 1201, and a tablet with the inscription 'Shoichii Tamura Daimyojin' dated July 1284 survives at the shrine. The shrine was extend¥lively reconstructed by Hosokawa Katsumoto in 1460. It was destroyed in the wars of the Tenshō era (1573-1592), but reconstructed again under the patronage of the Matsudaira clan, the daimyo of Takamatsu Domain under the Tokugawa shogunate. In 1679, Ichinomiya-ji was separated from the Tamura Jinja, and the shrine lost its position as a stop on the Shikoku pilgrimage.

During the Meiji period era of State Shinto, the shrine was rated as a   under the Modern system of ranked Shinto Shrines

The shrine is located a 10-minute walk from Ichinomiya Station on the Takamatsu-Kotohira Electric Railroad  Kotoden Kotohira Line .

Gallery

See also
List of Shinto shrines
Ichinomiya

References
 Plutschow, Herbe. Matsuri: The Festivals of Japan. RoutledgeCurzon (1996) 
 Ponsonby-Fane, Richard Arthur Brabazon. (1959).  The Imperial House of Japan. Kyoto: Ponsonby Memorial Society. OCLC 194887

External links

Official home page

Notes

Shinto shrines in Kagawa Prefecture
Sanuki Province
Takamatsu, Kagawa
Ichinomiya